Jocara nigrisquama is a species of snout moth. It is found in Argentina.  It was first described by Paul Dognin in 1904.

References

Moths described in 1904
Jocara